Asante Akim South Municipal District is one of the forty-three districts in Ashanti Region, Ghana. Originally created as an ordinary district assembly in 1988 as Asante Akim South District, which it was created from the former Asante Akim District Council. Later it was elevated to municipal district assembly status on 15 March 2018. The municipality is located in the eastern part of Ashanti Region and has Juaso as its capital town.

Settlements 
 Juaso (capital)
 Ofoase
 Obogu
 Pra-River
 Morso
 Komeso
 Dampong
 Asuboa
 Dwendwenase
 Wenkyi
 Nnadieso
 Asuboa
 Dampong
 Breku
 Adansi
 Atwedie
 Banso
 Banso-Asuboi
 Banka
 Bankame
 Yawkwei
 Kyempo
 Odubi
 Nkwanta
 Atiemo
 Tokwai
 Tokwai-Asuboi
 Bompata
 Asankare
 Kadjo Formanso
 Takyikrom

Sources
 
 GhanaDistricts.com

Districts of Ashanti Region